Pheidole morrisii is a species of ant and a higher myrmicine in the family Formicidae.

Subspecies
These two subspecies belong to the species Pheidole morrisii:
 Pheidole morrisii impexa Wheeler, 1908 i c g
 Pheidole morrisii morrisii Forel, 1886 i c g
Data sources: i = ITIS, c = Catalogue of Life, g = GBIF, b = Bugguide.net

References

Further reading

 

morrisii
Articles created by Qbugbot
Insects described in 1886